Arthur James Plunkett, 9th Earl of Fingall KP PC (I) (29 March 1791 – 21 April 1869) was an Irish peer, styled Lord Killeen from 1797 to 1836. He became Earl of Fingall in 1836 on the death of his father the 8th Earl and was appointed a Knight of the Order of St Patrick on 9 October 1846. His mother was Frances Donelan, daughter of John Donelan of Ballydonnellan, County Galway and his wife Mabel Hore.

Like his father he was a convinced supporter of the cause of Catholic emancipation. Both father and son worked for years with Daniel O'Connell to achieve it.

He married Louisa Emilia Corbally, daughter of Elias Corbally of Corbalton Hall, County Meath and his wife Mary Netterville (née Keogh), and had eight children, including Arthur, 10th Earl of Fingall, and the noted diplomat Sir Francis Richard Plunkett.

References

External links 
 

1791 births
1869 deaths
Irish unionists
Knights of St Patrick
Lord-Lieutenants of Meath
Members of the Privy Council of Ireland
Killeen, Arthur Plunkett, Lord
Killeen, Arthur Plunkett, Lord
Killeen, Arthur Plunkett, Lord
UK MPs who inherited peerages
Whig (British political party) Lords-in-Waiting
Earls of Fingall